Michael Paul Huval, also known as Pete Huval (born February 1956), is an American politician and insurance agent from Breaux Bridge, Louisiana, currently serving as a Republican member of the Louisiana House of Representatives for District 46 in St. Martin Parish.

Early life and education 
A native of St. Martin Parish, Huval attended the University of Louisiana at Lafayette. He is a former president of both the Breaux Bridge Chamber of Commerce and the local Kiwanis International.

Career 
A former Democrat who switched parties to make the state House race, Huval previously served for nearly sixteen years from District 4 on the St. Martin Parish governing council. He won his first race for the council, then known as the police jury, in the fall of 1995, with 51 percent of the vote in a three-candidate all Democratic race. In that capacity, he was active in the Louisiana Police Jury Association. In 2003, he launched Mike Huval Agency, a private insurance firm based in Breaux Bridge and Opelousas in St. Landry Parish.

Huval won his House seat on April 2, 2011, in a special election to fill the vacancy created by the election of Representative Fred Mills to the Louisiana State Senate. Huval defeated fellow Republican Craig G. Prosper, a city council member from the parish seat of St. Martinville, 4,338 (58 percent) to 3,144 votes (42 percent).

Personal life 
He and his family are active in the St. Joseph Catholic Church in Parks in St. Martin Parish. He is also a member of the Knights of Columbus Catholic men's organization. Huval and his wife, the Vickie (née Collette), reside in the Grand Bois community of St. Martin Parish, Louisiana. He is the father of one grown daughter, Brooke Lynn Huval.

References

1956 births
Living people
Businesspeople from Louisiana
Louisiana Democrats
Louisiana Republicans
Members of the Louisiana House of Representatives
People from St. Martin Parish, Louisiana
University of Louisiana at Lafayette alumni
Louisiana city council members
21st-century American politicians
People from Breaux Bridge, Louisiana
Catholics from Louisiana